The Battle of Suomenlinna (also known as the Battle of Viapori or the Bombardment of Sweaborg) was fought on 9–11 August 1855 between Russian defenders and a joint British/French fleet during the Åland War. It was a part of the Crimean War.

Background
Constructed during the Swedish rule of Finland in the 18th century, the fortress of Viapori (:sv:Sveaborg, renamed in Finnish in 1918 as :fi:Suomenlinna) was the main defensive installation in the Grand Duchy of Finland. After the capital of the Grand Duchy of Finland was moved from Turku to Helsinki in 1812 the value of Viapori only increased. However, by the Crimean War the artillery of the fortress had already become obsolete. After the engagements of 1854 Russians (and Finns) expected an attack on Viapori in 1855. The small skirmishes that had been fought along the coast between Russian and British/French forces in the early summer of 1855 only worsened the fear while bulk of the Russian fleet had become isolated and surrounded in the port and fortress of Kronstadt off Saint Petersburg.

Battle

British and French naval forces consisting of 77 ships arrayed for the long-expected battle on 6 August 1855. They formed into a battle line more than 3 km off shore beyond the range of the defenders' obsolete artillery. Three days later the bombardment commenced. It continued for 47–48 hours, with 18,500 rounds fired. All the while, the attacker sat beyond the range of the defenders' guns. The British and French bombarded only the fortress of Viapori and avoided firing at the town of Helsinki directly. While the bombardment caused damage to the structures above ground, including to several gunpowder magazines which exploded, the bulk of the defending forces survived unscathed with their weaponry intact, leading to a stalemate with the attackers guns being unable to defeat the defender and defenders guns being unable to reach the attacker. Once the guns had become silenced, the ships remained in the same offshore position, leading to growing fears of a landing. However British and French forces landed troops neither at Viapori nor Helsinki, and eventually withdrew.

Citations

References 

 
 
 

Battles involving Finland
Suomenlinna
Battles of the Crimean War
1855 in Europe
Conflicts in 1855
August 1855 events
History of Helsinki